Srinivaspur Assembly constituency is one of the seats in Karnataka Legislative Assembly in India. It is part of Kolar Lok Sabha seat.

The election in 2018 was the ninth consecutive time that Ramesh Kumar and Venkata Shiva Reddy had contested against each other, Ramesh Kumar winning 5 times and Venkata Shiva Reddy four times. Ramesh Kumar has won this seat one more time but against some other candidate. Ramesh Kumar became speaker of the assembly in 2018, and was in the news when No Confidence motion against Kumaraswamy in 2019 dragged out too long, resulting in a clash between the governor and the government. He stepped down as speaker after his coalition was reduced to minority.

Assembly Members
 1962 : G. Narayana Gowda (INC)
 1967 : B. L. Narayanswamy (Independent)
 1972 : S. Bachi Reddy (Congress-O)
 1978 : Ramesh Kumar (Congress - I)
 1983 : G.K. Venkatashiva Reddy (Congress)
 1985 : Ramesh Kumar (Janata Party)
 1989 : G.K. Venkatashiva Reddy (Congress)
 1994 : Ramesh Kumar (Janata Party)
 1999 : G.K. Venkatashiva Reddy (Congress)
 2004 : Ramesh Kumar (Cong)
 2008 : G.K. Venkatashiva Reddy (Janata Dal - S)
 2013 : Ramesh Kumar (Cong)
 2018 : Ramesh Kumar (Cong)

Election Results

1962 Assembly Elections
 G. Narayana Gowda (INC) with 20,311 votes 
 B. L. Narayanaswamy (Ind) : 15,082 votes.

1967 Assembly Elections
 B. L. Narayanswamy (Independent) with 18,801 votes
 S. B. Reddy (INC) who got 16094 votes.

1972 Assembly Elections
 S. Bachi Reddy (Congress-O) with 29,616 votes
 H Syed Abdul Aleem (Congress) who got 11,728 votes

1978 Assembly Elections
 Ramesh Kumar (Congress-I) : 31,867 votes 
 R.G. Narayanareddy (Congress) : 12,067

Results 1983 to 2008
 1983 Assembly : G.K. Venkatashiva Reddy (Cong) defeated Ramesh Kumar (Ind) 
 1985 Assembly : Ramesh Kumar (Janata Party) beat G.K. Venkata Shiva Reddy of the Indian National Congress
 1989 Assembly : G.K. Venkata Shiva Reddy (Congress) beat Ramesh Kumar (Janata Dal)
 1994 Assembly : Ramesh Kumar (Janata Party) beat G.K. Venkata Shiva Reddy of the Indian National Congress
 1999 Assembly : G.K. Venkata Shiva Reddy (Congress) beat Ramesh Kumar (Independent)
 2004 Assembly : Ramesh Kumar (Congress) beat G.K. Venkata Shiva Reddy (BJP)
 2008 Assembly : G.K. Venkata Shiva Reddy (Janada Dal (S)) beat Ramesh Kumar (Congress)

2013 Assembly Elections
 Ramesh Kumar (Cong) : 83,426 votes 
 G. K. Venkata Shiva Reddy (JD-S) : 79,533

2018 Assembly Elections
 Ramesh Kumar (Cong) : 93,571 votes 
 G. K. Venkata Shiva Reddy (JD-S) : 83,019

See also 
 Kolar District
 List of constituencies of Karnataka Legislative Assembly

References 

Assembly constituencies of Karnataka